Durant Motors Inc. was established in 1921 by former General Motors CEO William "Billy" Durant following his termination by the GM board of directors and the New York bankers who financed GM.

Corporate relationships
Durant Motors attempted to be a full-line automobile producer of cars and fielded the Flint, Durant, and Star brands, which were designed to meet Buick, Oldsmobile, Oakland, and Chevrolet price points. Billy Durant also acquired luxury-car maker Locomobile of Bridgeport, Connecticut, at its liquidation sale in 1922; in theory, Locomobile gave him a product that would compete against Cadillac, Rolls-Royce, and Pierce-Arrow. Durant Motors had a relationship with the Dort, Frontenac, and DeVaux automobile name badges. The Rugby line was the export name for Durant's Star car line. However, from 1928 to 1931, Durant marketed trucks in the US and Canadian markets under the badge Rugby Trucks. The Princeton, a model aimed at the Packard and Cadillac price points, was planned but never realized; also planned was the Eagle car line, but it never made it off the drafting tables.

Production
Durant co-founded a truck-making subsidiary, Mason Truck, and also acquired numerous ancillary companies to support Durant Motors. In 1927, the Durant line was shut down to retool for a brand-new, modernized car for 1928, re-emerging in 1928 with Durant, Locomobile, and Rugby lines in place, and dropping the Mason Truck and Flint automobile lines and the top-selling Star car in April 1928. In 1929, Locomobile went out of production.

Initially, Durant Motors enjoyed success based upon Billy Durant's track record at General Motors, where he assembled independent makes Chevrolet, Oakland, Oldsmobile, Buick, and Cadillac. However, when sales failed to meet volumes sufficient to sustain Durant Motors holdings, the firm's financial footing began to slip. As a result, Durant Motors began losing market share and dealers. The final Durant-branded models rolled off the US assembly line in August 1931 at Lansing, but continued in Canada into 1932 under Dominion Motors, which also built the Frontenac.

Subsequent history
The Lansing, Michigan, Durant plant on Verlinden Avenue opened in 1920. After the demise of Durant, it remained closed until GM purchased it in 1935. It restarted production for GM's Fisher Body Division, later becoming the Buick-Oldsmobile-Cadillac factory. It was finally combined with another Lansing plant to become Lansing Car Assembly. That factory was closed on May 6, 2005.

Durant's Flint, Michigan, factory was bought by the Fisher Body Division of General Motors, and built mostly Buick bodies until its 1987 closure.

Durant's Oakland, California, plant, located at the northeast corner of East 14th Street (now International Blvd.) and Durant Avenue (also the boundary between Oakland and San Leandro), later became a General Motors parts warehouse. Part of the plant survives as loft apartments and the Durant Square shopping center.

The company's Canadian Leaside, Ontario, plant later became a factory for the Canadian Wire and Cable Company, though it was later demolished and is now a neighborhood shopping center.

Durant's former plant in Elizabeth, New Jersey, housed one of the first supermarkets in the 1930s, and then was used as a cookie bakery by Burry Biscuits for many years. It was in use as a warehouse when it was destroyed by fire in December 2011.

Billy Durant died nearly broke at age 85 in 1947, the same year as Henry Ford, aged 83.

Production model specifications
Durant Touring Car

See also

Flint (automobile)
Rugby (automobile)
Star (automobile)
Mason Truck
List of defunct United States automobile manufacturers

References

Further reading
Tad Burness, 1920–1939 Car Spotters Guide, Motorbooks International

External links
Durant Motors Automobile Club

 
Defunct manufacturing companies based in Lansing, Michigan
Motor vehicle manufacturers based in Michigan
Defunct manufacturing companies based in Michigan
Vehicle manufacturing companies established in 1921
Vehicle manufacturing companies disestablished in 1931
1921 establishments in Michigan
1931 disestablishments in Michigan
Companies based in Flint, Michigan